Lesser Slave Lake Provincial Park is a provincial park and birdwatching area located in north-central Alberta, Canada.

The park is located on the northeastern shore of the Lesser Slave Lake (while Hilliard's Bay Provincial Park, Lesser Slave Lake Wildland and Grouard Trail Park Reserve stand on the northwestern shore), 12 km north from the town of Slave Lake on Highway 88.

Marten Mountain Viewpoint overlooks the lake at an elevation of 983 metres. The Boreal Centre for Bird Conservation, an education and research centre, is also located in the park. The centre is a transit place for more than 246 bird species (including 23 species of wood warblers).

See also
List of provincial parks in Alberta
List of Canadian provincial parks
List of National Parks of Canada

External links
Park page at AB parks
Boreal Centre for Bird Conservation

Municipal District of Lesser Slave River No. 124
Provincial parks of Alberta
Nature centres in Canada